Kanatte Cemetery, also known locally as Borella Cemetery, is Colombo's main burial ground and crematorium.

It is located at the intersection of Elvitigala Mawatha (Narahenpita Road), Bauddhaloka Mawatha (Bullers Road) and D. S. Senanayake Mawatha (Baseline Road).

The  cemetery is owned and operated by the Colombo Municipal Council and contains a Commonwealth War Graves Plot with a number of additional war graves dispersed around the site. The war graves include those of a German soldier, a German merchant seaman, a German interned civilian and an Austrian nursing sister. There are over 60 World War I Commonwealth servicemen and nearly 300 World War II Commonwealth servicemen buried here.

The cemetery was established in 1866 and is the main place of burial for all religions and nationalities, with separate sections for Hindus, Buddhists, Shintos, Roman Catholics, Anglicans and non-denominational Christians. The first burial was in May 1866, prior to this most British burials occurred at the Galle Face Burial Grounds, an area near the current Presidential Secretariat building. In the 1920s, those graves were exhumed and the remains were interred at Kanatte.

The cemetery's most famous Westerner interred at the cemetery is British-born science fiction writer Sir Arthur C. Clarke (1917–2008).

See also 
 British Garrison Cemetery
 Kandy War Cemetery
 Liveramentu Cemetery
 Trincomalee British War Cemetery

External links
 
 Index of War Dead in Kanatte Cemetery

References

Cemeteries in Sri Lanka
Commonwealth War Graves Commission cemeteries in Sri Lanka
1866 establishments in Ceylon
Tourist attractions in Colombo